Israel competed at the 2004 Summer Olympics in Athens, Greece, from 13 to 29 August 2004. It was the nation's thirteenth appearance at the Summer Olympics.

The Olympic Committee of Israel sent 36 athletes to the Games, 20 men and 16 women, to compete in 13 sports. The team's size was smaller by three from that sent to the previous games in Sydney (which was, by far, the nation's largest delegation). Nine athletes had competed in Sydney, including sprint canoer and Olympic bronze medalist Michael Kolganov and European judo champion Ariel Ze'evi, who later became the nation's flag bearer in the opening ceremony.

Notable Israeli athletes featured tennis men's doubles team Jonathan Erlich and Andy Ram, Russian imports Larissa Kosorukova in sprint canoeing and Alexander Danilov in men's pistol shooting, and synchronized swimming pair Anastasia Gloushkov and Inna Yoffe, the youngest of the team at age 16. Apart from Kosorukova and Danilov (both competed for Russia in 1996), Georgian-born wrestler Gocha Tsitsiashvili and rifle shooter Guy Starik made their third Olympic appearances as the most experienced members of the team.

Israel left Athens with two medals, including its first ever Olympic gold from windsurfer Gal Fridman in men's mistral one design. On the other hand, the bronze medal was awarded to judoka Ariel Ze'evi in men's half-heavyweight division.

Medalists

Athletics 

Israeli athletes have so far achieved qualifying standards in the following athletics events (up to a maximum of 3 athletes in each event at the 'A' Standard, and 1 at the 'B' Standard).

Key
 Note – Ranks given for track events are within the athlete's heat only
 Q = Qualified for the next round
 q = Qualified for the next round as a fastest loser or, in field events, by position without achieving the qualifying target
 NR = National record
 N/A = Round not applicable for the event
 Bye = Athlete not required to compete in round

Men
Track & road events

Field events

Women
Track & road events

Canoeing

Sprint

Qualification Legend: Q = Qualify to final; q = Qualify to semifinal

Fencing

Israel has qualified one fencer.

Women

Gymnastics

Artistic
Men

Rhythmic

Judo

Five Israeli judoka qualified for the following events.

Men

Women

Sailing

Israeli sailors have qualified one boat for each of the following events.

Men

Women

M = Medal race; OCS = On course side of the starting line; DSQ = Disqualified; DNF = Did not finish; DNS= Did not start; RDG = Redress given

Shooting 

Men

Swimming 

Women

Synchronized swimming 

Two Israeli synchronized swimmers qualified a spot in the women's duet.

Table tennis

Taekwondo

Israel has qualified one taekwondo jin.

Tennis

Three Israeli tennis players qualified for the following events.

Wrestling 

Key
  - Victory by Fall.
  - Decision by Points - the loser with technical points.
  - Decision by Points - the loser without technical points.

Men's Greco-Roman

See also
 Israel at the 2004 Summer Paralympics

References

External links
Official Report of the XXVIII Olympiad
Olympic Committee of Israel 

Nations at the 2004 Summer Olympics
2004
Summer Olympics